The Ateneo Law Journal is an academic journal of legal scholarship published by an independent student group at Ateneo Law School.

Overview
The journal is published four times a year, with occasional special issues. Topics covered are not restricted to local themes and the journal publishes foreign and international essayists whom it considers noteworthy. The Supreme Court of the Philippines has cited articles published in the journal in its decisions, the latest of which is Heirs of Dicman v. Cariño, G.R. No. 146459, June 8, 2006. Since volume 47, each June issue covers the most important cases decided by the Supreme Court for the previous year.

History
The Ateneo Law Journal published its first issue in 1951. It began as a bi-monthly publication and early volumes featured the digests of Supreme Court decisions and questions and suggested answers to the Philippine Bar Examination. The journal celebrated its 50th anniversary in 2001 with the publication of its 46th volume (there was no publication in 1971 to 1973 when all co-curricular activities in the Ateneo de Manila University were suspended during the early years of martial law). Isabelita A. Tapia served as the journal's first female Editor-in-chief in 1970.

Selection
Beginning with Volume 47, the journal stopped the admission of staff members and adopted a more stringent admission process and criteria where only editors would be admitted directly to the journal's Board of Editors. The admission process now includes the setting of a minimum cumulative grade or quality point index for candidates, the exclusion of candidates on academic probation, an exhaustive editing examination, a comprehensive written commentary on a novel legal issue or Supreme Court decision, and a panel interview conducted by the entire membership of the Journal. Under this new policy, the journal ceased to be headed by an Editor-in-chief and an Executive Committee was established to head the Board of Editors. Three executive editors are selected by the Board of Editors through election.

The Board of Editors is made up of around 20 student editors. Around 10 new editors are admitted each year from the second and third year classes of the Ateneo Law School (totaling around 700 students).

Alumni
Prominent alumni of the Ateneo Law Journal include former Vice President of the Philippines Teofisto Guingona, former Senator Ernesto Maceda, the late Chief Justice Renato Corona, former Justices Adolfo Azcuna and Arturo Brion of the Supreme Court of the Philippines,  Court of Appeals Justice Hector Hofileña, Sandiganbayan Justice Francis E. Garchitorena, former Governor Evelio Javier, Congressmen Sergio Apostol, Regalado E. Maambong, and Exequiel Javier, Department of Finance Undersecretary Gaudencio R. Mendoza, Jr., Central Bank Governor Gabriel Singson,  Presidential Commission for Good Government Chairmen Camilo Sabio and Magtanggol T. Gunigundo, Bureau of Customs Commissioner Antonio M. Bernardo, Philippine Stock Exchange Presidents Eduardo De Los Angeles and Francisco Ed. Lim, Professors Jacinto D. Jimenez and Tranquil Salvador III, Deans Cynthia Roxas-Del Castillo, Cesar L. Villanueva, and Andres D. Bautista, and media personality Dong Puno.

Significant articles
Simeon N. Ferrer, Varying a Shareholder's Statutory Participation in Management by the Use of Non-statutory Devices: Is it Possible under our Corporation Statute?, Vol. 9, Issue 1 (1959).
Claudio Teehankee, The Very Essence of Constitutionalism, Vol. 21, Issue 1 (1976).
Cynthia Roxas-Del Castillo, Legal Recovery of Illegally Acquired Wealth, Vol. 31, Issue 1 (1987).
Adolfo S. Azcuna, The Writ of Amparo: A Remedy to Enforce Fundamental Rights, Vol. 37, p. 15 (1993).
Jacinto D. Jimenez, Taking Private Property for Public Purpose, Vol. 45, Issue 1 (2001).
Anna Leah Fidelis T. Castañeda, The Origins of Philippine Judicial Review, 1900–1935, Vol. 46, Issue 1 (2002).
Ricardo C. Puno, Sr., Legacies in Civil Law from Justice Arsenio P. Dizon and His Peers, Vol. 46, Issue 3 (2002).
Cesar L. Villanueva, Revisiting the Philosophical Underpinnings of Philippine Commercial Laws, Vol. 46, Issue 3 (2002).
Joaquin G. Bernas, From One-Man Rule to "People Power", Vol. 46, Issue 1 (2002).
Aloysius P. Llamzon, "The Generally Accepted Principles of International Law" as Philippine Law: *Towards a Structurally Consistent Use of Customary International Law in Philippine Courts, Vol. 47, Issue 1 (2003).
Renato Corona, The Importance of Public Attention to Far-reaching Public Issues and Policies, Vol. 48, Issue 1 (2004).
Vicente V. Mendoza, Towards Meaningful Reforms in the Bar Examinations, Vol. 48, Issue 3 (2004).
Ateneo Law Journal Editorial Board, The Father of Philippine Liberal Constitutionalism (In the Festschrift issue for Joaquin G. Bernas), Vol. 49, Issue 2 (2004)
Theoben Jerdan C. Orosa, Constitutional Kritarchy Under the Grave Abuse Clause, vol. 49 p. 565 (2004).

References

External links
About the Ateneo Law Journal
Ateneo Law Journal online

Ateneo de Manila University
Philippine law journals
Publications established in 1951
Law journals edited by students